Cavendish is a Canadian television sitcom, premiering on CBC Television in January 2019. Created by Mark Little and Andrew Bush, formerly of the sketch comedy troupe Picnicface, the series stars Little and Bush as Mark and Andy, brothers returning to their childhood home in Cavendish, Prince Edward Island for the first time since their parents' divorce, only to find that life in the town is much stranger and more surreal than they remember.

The cast also includes Kevin Eldon and Kathy Greenwood. The sitcom was filmed in Charlottetown, Prince Edward Island

Episodes

References

External links

2010s Canadian sitcoms
CBC Television original programming
2019 Canadian television series debuts
2019 Canadian television series endings
Television series by Temple Street Productions
Culture of Charlottetown
Television shows set in Prince Edward Island
Television shows filmed in Prince Edward Island
Television shows filmed in Nova Scotia